Saint-Émilion is an appellation d'origine contrôlée (AOC) for wine in the Bordeaux wine region of France, where it is situated in the Libourne subregion on the right bank of the Dordogne. As a cultural landscape demonstrating a long, living history of wine-making (dating from Roman times), Saint-Émilion was registered as a UNESCO World Heritage Site in 1999.

Its  represent 67.5% of the total area of wine-producing communes (Saint-Émilion, Saint-Christophe-des-Bardes, Saint-Hippolyte, Saint-Étienne-de-Lisse, Saint-Laurent-des-Combes, Saint-Pey-d’Armens, Saint-Sulpice-de-Faleyrens, Vignonet, and a part of the Libourne commune) and 6% of the total Bordeaux vineyard.

The wines of Saint-Émilion are typically blended from different grape varieties, the three main ones being Merlot (60% of the blend), Cabernet Franc (nearly 30%) and Cabernet Sauvignon (around 10%).

Classification 

Since 1955, there has been a classification of Saint-Émilion wine. The classification is updated every 10 years or so, and consists of the following levels: Premier grand cru classé A, Premier grand cru classé B, and Grand cru classé. As of the new classification in 2012, there are currently four estates at the highest level:  Château Cheval Blanc, Château Angélus, Château Ausone, and Château Pavie.

Saint-Émilion satellites 

Four other appellations situated immediately north and northeast of the Saint-Émilion AOC are collectively known as the "Saint-Émilion satellites". They are Lussac-Saint-Émilion, Montagne-Saint-Émilion, Puisseguin-Saint-Émilion, and Saint-Georges-Saint-Émilion.

See also 
 Bordeaux wine regions

Notes and references

External links 
 Wine site for Saint-Émilion 

Bordeaux AOCs